Felix Ruml (born 26 April 1993) is a German footballer who plays as a goalkeeper for TSV Gilching-Argelsried.

Career
Ruml made his professional debut for SpVgg Unterhaching in the 3. Liga on 27 September 2014, coming on as a substitute in the 75th minute for midfielder Sascha Bigalke after starting goalkeeper Michael Zetterer was sent off two minutes prior. The match finished as a 3–4 home loss for Unterhaching.

References

External links
 Profile at DFB.de
 Profile at kicker.de
 TSV Gilching-Argelsried statistics 2018–19
 TSV Gilching-Argelsried statistics 2018–19

1993 births
Living people
Footballers from Munich
German footballers
Germany youth international footballers
Association football goalkeepers
TSV 1860 Munich II players
SpVgg Unterhaching players
3. Liga players
SpVgg Unterhaching II players